Alan Wong is a chef and restaurateur known as one of 12 co-founders (along with Sam Choy, Roy Ambel Yamaguchi, Peter Merriman, Bev Gannon and more) of Hawaii Regional Cuisine. They came together to form an organization to create a new American regional cuisine, highlighting Hawaii's locally grown ingredients and diverse ethnic styles.  In 1994 they all came together and compiled a cookbook, The New Cuisine of Hawaii, to be sold for charity. Wong and Choy are alumni of the Kapiolani Community College Culinary Arts program. Wong had several restaurants in Hawaii, as well as one in Japan.

In 2009, Wong cooked a luau at the White House for President Obama at the annual White House Congressional picnic for members of Congress and their families.

In 2004, Wong appeared as a guest judge on the television cooking competition Top Chef (the episode, part one of the season two finale, aired on January 24, 2007). The Top Chef contestants, after enjoying a luncheon hosted by Wong welcoming them to Hawaii, were challenged to cater his birthday luau.

In 2007, he was awarded Chef of the Year by Santé Magazine. Also in 2001, Gourmet ranked one of his restaurants number six in a listing of America's Best Fifty Restaurants. In 1996, he was awarded the James Beard Award for Best Chef: Pacific Northwest. In 1994, Wong was recognized by Robert Mondavi Winery as one of 13 Rising Star Chefs in America.

Other interests

Currently all of Wong's restaurants have closed. The first to open and last to close, Alan Wong's King Street (Honolulu, HI) closed November, 2020 during the COVID-19 Pandemic. His other ventures that have closed include The Pineapple Room (2017), Honolulu, HI, Amasia (2014), Grand Wailea Resort, Maui, Alan Wong's Shanghai (2017) China, and Alan Wong's Hawaii, which was located in Tokyo Disneyland in Maihama, Japan.

See also
Cuisine of Hawaii

References

External links
AlanWongs.com

American food writers
Chefs from Hawaii
Asian American chefs
Living people
American people of Chinese descent
James Beard Foundation Award winners
Year of birth missing (living people)